Lure of the Yukon is a 1924 American silent Western film, also classified as a Northern film. It is directed by Norman Dawn and stars Eva Novak, Spottiswoode Aitken, and Buddy Roosevelt. It is set in Alaska during the Klondike Gold Rush of the 1890s, and was filmed on location in the Territory.

Cast
Eva Novak as Sue McGraig
Spottiswoode Aitken as Sourdough McCraig
Buddy Roosevelt as Bob Force (credited as Kent Sanderson)
Arthur Jasmine as Kuyak
Howard Webster as Dan Baird
Katherine Dawn as Ruth Baird
Eagle Eye as Black Otter

References

Bibliography

External links

1924 Western (genre) films
Silent American Western (genre) films
American black-and-white films
American silent feature films
1920s English-language films
Films about the Klondike Gold Rush
Films directed by Norman Dawn
Films set in the 1890s
Northern (genre) films
1920s American films